Kile or KILE may refer to:
 Darryl Kile, a Major League Baseball player
 Kile, a TeX/LaTeX text editor
 Kile, Warmian-Masurian Voivodeship, Poland
 Kile (surname)
 Kile (unit), an Ottoman unit of volume
 KWCC-FM, a radio station (89.5 FM) licensed to serve Woodland Park, Colorado, United States, which held the call sign KILE-FM from 2008 to 2017
 Skylark Field, the airport serving Killeen, Texas, United States, assigned ICAO code KILE
 KGOW, a radio station (1560 AM) licensed to Bellaire, Texas, United States, assigned call sign KILE from 1996 to 2007

See also

Keal (disambiguation)
Keel (disambiguation)
Keele (disambiguation)
Kiel (disambiguation)
Kil (disambiguation)
Kill (disambiguation)
Kyl (disambiguation)
Kyle (disambiguation)
Kyll